Arjun Sachin Tendulkar (born 24 September 1999) is an Indian cricketer from Mumbai, Maharashtra. He is the son of former legendary cricketer Sachin Tendulkar and is a left-handed medium fast bowler and left-handed lower order batsman. He plays for Goa cricket team in domestic cricket, having previously played for Mumbai cricket team and its junior teams. He was a member of Indian Premier League franchise Mumbai Indians's squad for the 2022 season but did not play any matches during the season.

Career

His under-19 debut for India was against Sri Lanka in 2018. He made his T20 debut on 15 January 2021, for Mumbai in the 2020–21 Syed Mushtaq Ali Trophy against Haryana. On debut, he took 1/34 off three overs.

Mumbai Indians brought him in auction ahead of the 2021 IPL. In September 2021, he was selected in Mumbai's senior squad for the first time. He was included in Mumbai's 22-man Syed Mushtaq Ali Trophy squad. However, he was later ruled out of the 2021 IPL due to injury. In February 2022, he was again brought by the MI, this time in the auction for the IPL 2022 tournament. In August 2022, he quit Mumbai to join Goa ahead of the domestic season. He is playing for them in 2022–23 Syed Mushtaq Ali Trophy.

On 13 December 2022, Tendulkar made his first-class debut while playing against  Rajasthan in the Ranji Trophy. He scored a maiden century hitting 120 in 207 balls in the first innings.

Personal life
Arjun Tendulkar was born in Mumbai, Maharashtra to former cricketer Sachin Tendulkar and Anjali Tendulkar (née Mehta) in 1999. He has an elder sister, Sara Tendulkar.

His maternal grandparents are Anand Mehta, a Gujarati from business family, and Annabel Mehta (née Lancaster), an English philanthropist who was awarded the Order of the British Empire for her service to underprivileged communities in Mumbai.

References

External links
 

1999 births
Living people
Indian cricketers
Mumbai cricketers
Cricketers from Mumbai
Marathi people
Gujarati people
Indian people of English descent